The Regional State Archives in Hamar is a regional state archives situated in Hamar, Norway. Part of the National Archival Services of Norway, it is responsible for archiving documents from state institutions in the counties of Oppland and Hedmark. The collection includes nine shelf-kilometers of material.

The agency was created on 13 July 1917, taking over archives from the two counties from the Regional State Archives in  Oslo. It initially had officies at Parkgt. 2, moving to Strandgt. 71 in 1958. It moved to its current location at Lille Strandgt. 3 in 1991.

References

National Archival Services of Norway
Organisations based in Hamar
1917 establishments in Norway
Government agencies established in 1917